A gang is a group of recurrently associating individuals who share a common identity.

Gang may also refer to:

People
 Gang of Balhae (died 809), sixth king of Balhae
 Gang Bing (died 1410), Chinese general and eunuch who served during the Ming dynasty
 Gang Badoy, public intellectual, radio and television host, feature writer, businesswoman, and educator from the Philippines
 Gang Tian (born 1958), Chinese mathematician
 Jeanne Gang (born 1964), American architect
 Kang (Korean surname) or Gang, a common Korean surname

Places
 Gang, Cornwall, UK, a hamlet
 Gang, Missouri, a community in the United States
 Gang Ranch, British Columbia, Canada

Arts and entertainment

Film
 Gang (film), a Bollywood film released in 2000
 Gangs (film), a Hong Kong film directed by Lawrence Ah Mon, released in 1988
 The Gang (film), a Malayalam film released in 2000

Music
 Gang (album), a 1986 album by Johnny Hallyday
 Gang (Headie One and Fred Again album), a 2020 collaborative album by Headie One and Fred Again
 Gangs (album), a 2011 album by And So I Watch You From Afar
 "Gang" (Masaharu Fukuyama song), a 2001 song by Masaharu Fukuyama
 "Gang" (Rain song), a 2017 song by Rain

Other uses
 Gang, a collective noun for certain species; see List of collective nouns
 Gang, alternate spelling of Gangr, a giant in Norse mythology
 Studio Gang Architects, an architecture firm led by Jeanne Gang

See also
 Chain gang, a group of prisoners chained together to perform work
 Jiang (disambiguation)